Andromeda XIX is a satellite galaxy of the Andromeda Galaxy (M31), a member of the Local Group, like the Milky Way Galaxy. Andromeda XIX is considered "the most extended dwarf galaxy known in the Local Group", and has been shown to have a half-light radius of 1.7 kiloparsec (kpc). It was discovered by the Canada–France–Hawaii Telescope, and is thought to be a dwarf galaxy.

As with other dwarf galaxies, Andromeda XIX is not producing new stars: 90% of its star formation occurred over 9 billion years ago. However, compared to dwarf galaxies of similar mass Andromeda XIX is extremely diffuse, like Antlia II.

History 
Surveillance was performed during use of the MegaPrime/MegaCam 1 deg2 (camera) on the Canada-France-Hawaii Telescope (CFHT) had mapped the Andromeda Galaxy's stellar halo (one quarter) up to ~150 kpc.  The survey confirmed the clumpiness of Andromeda's stellar halo. It had shown the existence of multiple other dwarf galaxies. They include: Andromeda XI, XII, XIII, XV, XVI, XVIII, XIX, and XX.

See also 
List of Andromeda's satellite galaxies

References 

Andromeda (constellation)
Dwarf galaxies
Interacting galaxies
5056919
Andromeda Subgroup